The Desert Diamond West Valley Phoenix Grand Prix was an IndyCar Series race held at the Phoenix Raceway in Avondale, Arizona, United States. USAC moved the fall race and added a spring race to the newly built Phoenix International Raceway in 1964. The race became a CART event in 1979, and joined the Indy Racing League in 1996. It was held continuously through 2005.

After a hiatus of eleven years, the race was revived by the IndyCar Series in 2016. It was held on Saturday night under the lights. Long considered a popular Indy car track, Phoenix saw the final career victory for Mario Andretti (1993).

History
During its time on the USAC Championship Car circuit, Phoenix International Raceway typically held two races annually, one in the spring, and one in the fall. During the CART years, two races were scheduled through the mid-1980s, but the track dropped down to one race per year starting in 1987. In many years, Phoenix served as the CART season opener. After a feud between the track ownership and CART series officials, the track was dropped from the CART schedule after 1995, and immediately switched to the Indy Racing League beginning in 1996.

Citing low attendance, the race was put on hiatus after the 2005 season. In 2007, the Grand Prix Arizona for the Champ Car series was planned on a street circuit in downtown Phoenix nearby to the original course used for the United States Grand Prix. The event was cancelled four months before the event due to insufficient sponsorship funding.

After a long hiatus, the track returned to the IndyCar Series schedule in 2016. The race was the only 1-mile oval on the schedule. The race was scheduled for a twilight start, and raced into the night under the lights. With the reconfiguring of the track in 2011, the circuit measured 1.022 miles in length, and the race was scheduled for 255.5 miles. Desert Diamond West Valley was announced as the title sponsor of the race for 2016 on March 23. Following the 2018 race the raceway announced the series would not return for 2019, citing poor attendance.

Past winners

Phoenix International Raceway

 2016 race at PIR, after 2011 reconfiguration, is measured at 1.022 miles.
  = Firestone
  = Goodyear
 Bold denotes this was the drivers first ever IndyCar win

Support races

Selected race summaries

CART PPG Indy Car World Series history
1986: Michael Andretti led 78 laps, but his engine started smoking on lap 163. Kevin Cogan took the lead on lap 164, and won his first (and only) career Indy car race. Cogan finished a lap ahead of second place Tom Sneva.
1987: Roberto Guerrero qualified third, but failed post-qualifying inspection for being 2.5 pounds underweight. He was forced to start last on the grid. Guerrero quickly charged through the field, and was in the top five by lap 46. He dueled with Bobby Rahal for the lead on lap 62, and dominated the second half. Even a stop-and-go penalty for hitting a tire in the pits did not slow Guerrero's run. Guerrero won by 8 seconds over Rahal, becoming only the fourth driver in modern Indy car history to win a race from the last starting position and the first Colombian to win a racing career in history.
1988: Polesitter Rick Mears led the first 22 laps, and stretched out to a large, dominating lead. Coming out of turn four on lap 22, however, Mears tangled with Randy Lewis, spun down the main stretch, and came to rest with a broken suspension. Mario Andretti led the final 135 laps to win.
1989: Danny Sullivan held the lead late, but his Penske teammate Rick Mears blew by him on lap 183. Sullivan pitted for tires, but his pitside tank had no more fuel to take on. Mears had a lap on the entire field as he stretched his fuel to the victory. At the line, Al Unser Jr. barely held off Sullivan for second place.
1990: Rick Mears made it back-to-back victories at Phoenix, this time in dominating fashion. Mears led the final 132 laps, nearly lapping the field at one point. The attention focused on the battle for second between Galles-Kraco Racing teammates Bobby Rahal and Al Unser Jr. On lap 189, Rahal was able to weave through lapped traffic and pass Unser for second, as Mears cruised to victory.
1991: Arie Luyendyk, driving for the fledgling Bob Tezak UNO/Granatelli Racing, took the lead on lap 143. Luyendyk pulled out to a large lead while Bobby Rahal, Emerson Fittipaldi, and Michael Andretti battled wheel-to-wheel for second. Fittipaldi and Rahal were side-by-side when Danny Sullivan's Alfa Romeo engine blew, bringing out the yellow and white flag. Fittipaldi passed Rahal, but it was after the yellow light came on. Luyendyk won his second Indy car race, and Rahal was restored to second.
1992: Bobby Rahal led wire-to-wire, leading all 200 laps en route to victory. Rahal became the first driver to accomplish that feat at Phoenix since A. J. Foyt in 1964. Michael Andretti qualified for the pole position, the first pole for the Ford-Cosworth XB engine, but his car didn't even pull away from the starting grid. He was pushed to the pits due to fouled spark plugs, and started the race four laps behind the field.
1993: Rookie Nigel Mansell arrived at Phoenix anticipating his first open wheel oval race, but crashed during practice and sat out with a back injury. Mansell's teammate Mario Andretti won the race, and became the oldest winner of an Indy car race (53 years, 34 days). It was Mario Andretti's final Indy car victory.
1994: Hiro Matsushita touched wheels with Teo Fabi in turn three on lap 63. The two cars crashed and collected leader Paul Tracy. Seconds later, rookie Jacques Villeneuve came upon the scene in the high groove, and t-boned Matsushita's car, splitting it in two, and sending it spinning wildly to the infield. Matsushita escaped with no injuries besides a sore shoulder. Later in the race, Mario Andretti crashed on the backstretch, and Michael Andretti clipped another car, which sheared off his left front wheel, which bounced into a spectator area. No injuries were reported. Emerson Fittipaldi won, with his Penske teammate Al Unser Jr. second. After sitting out the race a year before, Nigel Mansell placed third.
1995: In the closing laps, Paul Tracy and Emerson Fittipaldi battled for the lead. Both had to pit though for a "splash-and-go" to make it to the finish. With 7 laps to go Fittipaldi's pit stop handed the lead to Michael Andretti, but Andretti did not realize he had inherited the lead. Andretti allowed Robby Gordon to pass him for the lead with five laps to go, and Gordon won his first career CART series race. It would be the final CART series race at Phoenix.

IndyCar Series
1996: The race switched to the new Indy Racing League. On lap 128, Foyt Racing drivers Scott Sharp and Mike Groff (running 1st-2nd) ducked into the pits for their final stop. However, they did not see that the yellow flag had come out, and were penalized one lap for pitting while the pits were closed. Arie Luyendyk cruised over the final 66 laps to victory. During a practice run, Buddy Lazier suffered a fractured back after a crash. Lazier would come back to win the Indy 500 two months later.
1997: Independent owner/driver Jim Guthrie authored one of the biggest underdog wins in Indy Racing League/IndyCar history. On lap 180, a crash involving Sam Schmidt and Kenny Brack brought out a lengthy yellow flag. Guthrie stayed out, looking to stretch his fuel over the final 82 laps. Guthrie held off a hard-charging Tony Stewart over the final ten laps to secure his lone Indy car victory. Going into the race, Guthrie was forced to take out a second mortgage on his home to purchase his chassis.
1998: On lap 59, Eliseo Salazar spun and collected Dave Steele and Robbie Buhl. Trying to avoid the crash, Arie Luyendyk touched wheels with Salazar, and slid through turn 2 upside down. On lap 169, the leaders pitted under caution, but Scott Sharp stayed out, gambling on track position. On lap 186, Kenny Brack and Mike Groff touched wheels, crashing hard. The long yellow allowed Sharp to conserve fuel. With two laps to go, the green came out with Sharp leading. Tony Stewart and Billy Boat were caught up behind the slow car of Mark Dismore, allowing Sharp to hold on for the win. After the race, Dismore was fined $5,000 for unsportsmanlike conduct, and Sharp was fined $15,000 when he failed post-race inspection with an oversized fuel tank.
2001: In preparations for their return to the Indianapolis 500, Penske Racing enters their CART regulars Hélio Castroneves and Gil de Ferran for the IRL season opener at Phoenix. Both Penske cars, however, would drop out. Sam Hornish Jr., driving in his first start for Panther Racing, won his first career Indy car race. Hornish beat the leaders out of the pits with 73 laps to go, and dominated the rest of the way.
2005: Tomas Scheckter brushed the outside wall in turn four on lap 193, bringing out the caution, and setting up a two-lap sprint to the checkered flag. Sam Hornish Jr. led Dario Franchitti and Hélio Castroneves. Hornish got a good jump on the restart, while Franchitti slipped high in turn two, whitewalling the tires. Hornish won the race, while Franchitti fell back to 4th. Tony Kanaan, who finished third, started 21st and passed half the field on the first lap.
2016: After an eleven-year hiatus, the IndyCar Series returned to Phoenix for a race under the lights. The track had been slightly reconfigured since the last race in 2005, and now was measured at 1.022 miles in length. In addition, the race length was lengthened to 250 laps. Hélio Castroneves broke the track record during qualifying, setting a new one-lap record of 192.631 mph. Passing was difficult during the race, and tire wear was a major factor. Penske teammates Castroneves and Juan Pablo Montoya both suffered tire failures while leading in the first half. Scott Dixon took the lead and led the final 155 laps to victory.

References

External links
 Champ Car Stats: Fairgrounds archive, PIR archive, Indy Lights archive
 Ultimate Racing History: Fairgrounds archive, Phoenix archive

Former IndyCar Series races
Champ Car races
Motorsport in Arizona
Sports in Phoenix, Arizona
Recurring sporting events established in 1915
Recurring sporting events disestablished in 1916
Recurring sporting events established in 1950
Recurring sporting events disestablished in 2005
Recurring sporting events established in 2016
Recurring sporting events disestablished in 2018
1915 establishments in Arizona
1916 disestablishments in Arizona
1950 establishments in Arizona
2005 disestablishments in Arizona
2016 establishments in Arizona
2018 disestablishments in Arizona